Robert Bradley's Blackwater Surprise was an American band from Detroit, Michigan. The group was a collaboration between Robert Bradley, a blind street singer, and three rock musicians.

History
The band formed in 1994 when former members of the band Second Self met the blind street performer Robert Bradley. Bradley was born in Alabama, and gained musical experience by singing as a child at The Alabama School for the Blind. He had spent several years in Detroit by 1994, performing occasionally on the street, and playing on Saturdays in Detroit's Eastern Market, when guitarist Michael Nehra, bassist Andrew Nehra, and drummer Jeff Fowlkes overheard Bradley through an open window while rehearsing for a new project. After listening to Bradley sing for an hour, they invited him up to Nehra's studio, The White Room, to record several acoustic songs, then asked him to become their vocalist.

On September 17, 1996, RBBS released their 11-track debut. The result was marked as "an effective collaboration between a blind blues musician and a sympathetic Detroit rock trio." The album was produced by Michael and Andrew Nehra, and engineered and mixed by Michael Nehra. A live EP followed in 1999, and a follow-up studio album, Time to Discover, in 2000. This album featured guitarist Michael Nehra, his brother Andrew as bassist, and guest vocals by Kid Rock. Allmusic reviewer Mark Morgenstein praised Time to Discover as "the first modern blues classic of the new millennium." The album was produced by Michael and Andrew Nehra, and engineered and mixed by Michael Nehra.  Their next album, 2002's New Ground, was noted as "earnest... exuding a hard-won optimism and working-man's head-down forbearance." It peaked at #38 on Billboard's Top Independent Albums chart. It was quickly followed by Still Lovin' You in 2003 also released on Vanguard Records and produced, engineered, and mixed by Cherokee Studios co-founder Bruce Robb.

The group's next release was What About That: New Year's Eve in Bloomington (2006), a two-disc live album documenting the singer's once-annual New Year's stops at the Bluebird nightclub in Bloomington, Indiana. Produced by filmmaker/photographer/journalist Wes Orshoski, it features 22 songs, including four acoustic tracks recorded at soundcheck, an acoustic version of "Once Upon a Time," then-new songs "New Orleans" and "What About the Man," and an a cappella rendition of "Will the Circle Be Unbroken". Five years after their previous studio record, Robert Bradley's Blackwater Surprise released Out of the Wilderness in 2008. The songs "Love You in the Daytime," "Cryin’ My Eyes Out," and "Everybody Wanna Party" are featured in the motion picture Love N’ Dancing, starring Amy Smart and Billy Zane. Bruce Robb returned as producer, engineer, and mixer.

Post-breakup
After the release of Out of the Wilderness, Robert Bradley moved back to Alabama, where he quit performing professionally, though he still sang and played in church services. He ran a vending machine supply business until a back injury made the work too difficult to continue. In 2016, he returned to Detroit and started busking again, which helped him reinvigorate his songwriting; as a result, he released a solo album, Down in the Bend, on Funky D Records in 2017. Jeff Fowlkes joined Too Slim and the Taildraggers in the mid-2010s. Mike and Andrew Nehra had founded audio equipment company Vintage King Engineering in 1993, and both continued their involvement with the company into the 2010s.

Film and TV work
Love N' Dancing (2009) - This romantic comedy starring Amy Smart and Billy Zane features six original new Robert Bradley songs, including Smart's grand finale dance number, "You're My Lady." The film and soundtrack were released in May 2009.
Playing for Change (2006) -  Bradley appears as himself in this 2006 music documentary. The soundtrack was recorded live on the streets and in the subways of the three cities: Los Angeles, New Orleans and New York.
Lackawanna Blues (2005) - Bradley appears in this HBO movie starring S. Epatha Merkerson and Terrence Howard about Lackawanna, New York in 1956, at the dawn of integration.  He performs on-screen, and has three songs featured on the soundtrack (including a duet with Macy Gray).

Discography
Albums
Blackwater Surprise (RCA, 1996)
Authorized Bootleg: Live (RCA, 1997) - limited edition CD featuring four live tracks
Live (RCA, 1999)
Time to Discover (RCA, 2000)
New Ground (Vanguard, 2002)
Still Lovin' You (Vanguard, 2003)
What About That: New Year's Eve in Bloomington (Kufala, 2006)
 Out of the Wilderness (2008)

Compilation appearances
Believing in Detroit: A Tribute to Vladdy and Sergei (JFW, 1998) - a limited-edition compilation, original recording, featuring "Shake It Off"
KBCO Studio C Volume 12 Compilation Live In KBCO (KBCO, 2000) - recorded at a Boulder, Colorado radio studio, featuring "Baby", recorded live
KFOG Live from the Archives 8 (KFOG, 2001) - live, limited-edition compilation, featuring "Baby", recorded live in studio
Wish You a Merry Christmas (2001) - limited collector's edition, rare three-track CD single
Monitor This February/March 2002 (2002) - compilation featuring "Train"
It'll Come to You - The Songs of John Hiatt (Vanguard, 2003) - compilation featuring "It'll Come to You"
Relix Magazine Music Sampler July 2006 (Relix, 2006) - an import compilation featuring "Once Upon a Time"
Lackawanna Blues Soundtrack (HBO Films/Vanguard, 2004)  - produced by Bruce Robb, featuring Robert Bradley's "Dark Road," "Something Inside Me," and "Down on Me", a duet with Macy Gray

References

External links
[  Allmusic's profile of RBBS]

Rock music groups from Michigan
Musical groups established in 1994
Musical groups from Detroit
1994 establishments in Michigan